In cell biology, a granule is a small particle. It can be any structure barely visible by light microscopy. The term is most often used to describe a secretory vesicle.

In leukocytes
A group of leukocytes, called granulocytes, contain granules and play an important role in the immune system. The granules of certain cells, such as natural killer cells, contain components which can lead to the lysis of neighboring cells. The granules of leukocytes are classified as azurophilic granules or specific granules.
Leukocyte granules are released in response to immunological stimuli during a process known as degranulation.

In platelets
The granules of platelets are classified as dense granules and alpha granules.

α-Granules are unique to platelets and are the most abundant of the platelet granules, numbering 50–80 per platelet 2. These granules measure 200–500 nm in diameter and account for about 10% of platelet volume. They contain mainly proteins, both membrane-associated receptors (for example, αIIbβ3 and P-selectin) and soluble cargo (for example, platelet factor 4 [PF4] and fibrinogen). Proteomic studies have identified more than 300 soluble proteins that are involved in a wide variety of functions, including hemostasis (for example, von Willebrand factor [VWF] and factor V), inflammation (for example, chemokines such as CXCL1 and interleukin-8), and wound healing (for example, vascular endothelial growth factor [VEGF] and fibroblast growth factor [FGF]) 3. The classic representation of α-granules as spherical organelles with a peripheral limiting membrane, a dense nucleoid, and progressively lucent peripheral zones on transmission electron microscopy is probably simplistic and may be in part a preparation artifact. Electron tomography with three-dimensional reconstruction of platelets is notable for a significant percentage of tubular α-granules that generally lack VWF 4. More recent work using transmission electron microscopy and freeze substitution dehydration of resting platelets shows that α-granules are ovoid with a generally homogeneous matrix and that tubes form from α-granules upon activation 5. Thus, whether or not there exists significant structural heterogeneity among α-granules remains to be completely resolved. α-Granule exocytosis is evaluated primarily by plasma membrane expression of P-selectin (CD62P) by flow cytometry or estimation of the release of PF4, VWF, or other granule cargos.

Dense granules (also known as δ-granules) are the second most abundant platelet granules, with 3–8 per platelet. They measure about 150 nm in diameter 2. These granules, unique to the platelets, are a subtype of lysosome-related organelles (LROs), a group that also includes melanosomes, lamellar bodies of the type II alveolar cells, and lytic granules of cytotoxic T cells. Dense granules mainly contain bioactive amines (for example, serotonin and histamine), adenine nucleotides, polyphosphates, and pyrophosphates as well as high concentrations of cations, particularly calcium. These granules derive their name from their electron-dense appearance on whole mount electron microscopy, which results from their high cation concentrations . Dense granule exocytosis is typically evaluated by ADP/ATP release by using luciferase-based luminescence techniques, release of preloaded [ 3H] serotonin, or membrane expression of lysosome-associated membrane protein 2 (LAMP2) or CD63 by flow cytometry.

Other platelet granules have been described. Platelets contain about 1–3 lysosomes per platelet and peroxisomes, the platelet-specific function of which remains unclear. Lysosomal exocytosis is typically evaluated by estimation of released lysosomal enzymes such as beta hexosaminidase. An electron-dense granule defined by the presence of Toll-like receptor 9 (TLR9) and protein disulfide isomerase (PDI), termed the T granule, has also been described, although its existence remains controversial. PDI and other platelet-borne thiol isomerases have been reported to be packaged within a non-granular compartment derived from the megakaryocyte endoplasmic reticulum (ER), which may be associated with the dense tubular system.

Insulin granules in beta cells

A specific type of granule found in the pancreas is an insulin granule. Insulin is a hormone that helps to regulate the amount of glucose in the blood from getting too high, hyperglycemia, or too low, hypoglycemia.

Insulin granules are secretory granules, which can release their contents from the cell into the bloodstream. The beta cells in the pancreas are responsible for the storage of insulin and release of it at appropriate times. The beta cells closely control the release, and use unusual mechanisms to do so.

Insulin granule maturation process
Immature insulin granules function as a sorting chamber during the maturation process listed below. Insulin and other insoluble granule components are kept within the granules. Other soluble proteins and granule parts then bud off from the immature granule in a clathrin-coated transport vesicle. The process of proteolysis, removes the unwanted parts from the secretory granule resulting in mature granules.

Insulin granules mature in three steps: (1) the lumen of the granule undergoes acidification, due to the acidic properties of a secretory granule; (2) proinsulin becomes insulin through the process of proteolysis. The endoproteases PC1/3 and PC2 aid in this transformation from proinsulin to insulin; and (3) the clathrin protein coat is removed.

Germline granules
In 1957, André and Rouiller first coined the term "nuage". (French for "cloud"). Its amorphous and fibrous structure occurred in drawings as early as in 1933 (Risley). Today, the nuage is accepted to represent a characteristic, electrondense germ plasm organelle encapsulating the cytoplasmic face of the nuclear envelope of the cells destined to the germline fate. The same granular material is also known under various synonyms: dense bodies, mitochondrial clouds, yolk nuclei, Balbiani bodies, perinuclear P granules in Caenorhabditis elegans, germinal granules in Xenopus laevis, chromatoid bodies in mice, and polar granules in Drosophila. Molecularly, the nuage is a tightly interwoven network of differentially localized RNA-binding proteins, which in turn localize specific mRNA species for differential storage, asymmetric segregation (as needed for asymmetric cell division), differential splicing and/or translational control. The germline granules appear to be ancestral and universally conserved in the germlines of all metazoan phyla.

Many germline granule components are part of the piRNA pathway and function to repress transposable elements.

Plant cells
Granules are one of the non-living cell organelle of plant cell (the others-vacuole and nucleoplasm). It serves as small container of starch in plant cell.

Starch
In photosynthesis, plants use light energy to produce glucose from carbon dioxide. The glucose is stored mainly in the form of starch granules, in plastids such as chloroplasts and especially amyloplasts. Toward the end of the growing season, starch accumulates in twigs of trees near the buds. Fruit, seeds, rhizomes, and tubers store starch to prepare for the next growing season.

See also
Chromaffin granule
Kurloff cell

References

Cell anatomy